"Whoa Oh! (Me vs. Everyone)" is the debut single by Forever the Sickest Kids, released on April 1, 2008. It is from their debut album Underdog Alma Mater. The song's video aired on MTV's TRL on June 24. The song reached No. 38 on the Billboard Mainstream Top 40 chart. The remix version was released on May 26, 2009 on iTunes and features Selena Gomez.

Track listing
Digital download
"Whoa Oh! (Me vs. Everyone)" – 3:24

European single
"Whoa Oh! (Me vs. Everyone)" – 3:24
"Hurricane Haley" – 3:42

Remix single
"Whoa Oh! (Me vs. Everyone)" [featuring Selena Gomez] – 3:29

Music video
The music video came out 9 days after the official release of the song on April 10. The video shows the band playing near a drag strip with an airplane in the background. The video goes through showing vocalist Jonathan Cook, falling for a race car girl. Jonathan then sneaks into a trailer of a race car driver and gets into uniform. Jonathan gets into a car, precedes to race but crashes. As he exits the race car, the girl rushes to his side to give him a kiss. He then leans in and gives a thumbs up.  The video ends with the band walking away into the sunset.

References

External links
 

2008 songs
2008 debut singles
2009 singles
Forever the Sickest Kids songs
Selena Gomez songs
Universal Motown Records singles
Music videos directed by Shane Drake